Doren may refer to the following people
Given name
Doren Robbins (born 1949), American poet

Surname
Arnold Doren (1935–2003), American photographer
Charles Doren, American bishop
Electra Collins Doren (1861–1927), American suffragette and library scientist
Van Doren (disambiguation)